Korol i Shut (King and Jester) is the second album of the Russian rock group Korol i Shut. It was released in 1996. This album is a re-recording of a non-official 1994 release «Make Yourself At Home, Wayfarer». In 2000, the album was re-issued again under its original name.

Track listing
 Korol i Shut (The King and the Jester) — 2:41
 Dva Druga (Two Friends) — 2:14
 Sapogi Mertvetsa (Dead Man's Boots) — 2:29
 Okhotnik (The Hunter) — 2:35
 Panika v Sele (Panic in the Village) — 3:16
 Istinny Ubiytsa (True Killer) — 2:02
 Lesnik (Forester) — 3:11
 Pomogi Mne! (Help Me! ) — 2:26
 Istorya o Myortvoy Zhenshchine (Story about a Dead Woman) — 3:43
 Kukolny Teatr (Puppet Theater) — 2:52
 Valet i Dama  (The Jack and the Queen) — 3:31
 Vesyolye Trolli (The Jolly Trolls) — 3:32
 Vyacheslav (Vyacheslav) — 2:17
 Otets i Maski (The Father and the Masks) — 3:03
 Skazka pro Drakona (The Tale of a Dragon) — 2:53
 Instrument (Instrument) — 2:04
 Sobraniye (The Gathering) — 4:03

References
 Album on the Official site

1996 albums
Korol i Shut albums